Below are the results for season 14 (XIV) of the World Poker Tour (2015–16).

Results

Canadian Spring Championship

 Casino: Playground Poker Club, Kahnawake, Quebec
 Buy-in: $3,500
 6-Day Event: May 1–6, 2015
 Number of Entries: 370
 Total Prize Pool: $1,148,480
 Number of Payouts: 45

WPT Amsterdam

 Casino: Holland Casino, Amsterdam, Netherlands
 Buy-in: €3,300
 6-Day Event: May 11–16, 2015
 Number of Entries: 341
 Total Prize Pool: €992,310
 Number of Payouts: 45

WPT Choctaw

 Casino: Choctaw Casino Resort, Durant, Oklahoma
 Buy-in: $3,700
 5-Day Event: July 31 – August 4, 2015
 Number of Entries: 1,175
 Total Prize Pool: $3,989,125
 Number of Payouts: 145

Legends of Poker

 Casino: The Bicycle Hotel & Casino, Bell Gardens, California
 Buy-in: $3,700
 7-Day Event: August 29 – September 4, 2015
 Number of Entries: 786
 Total Prize Pool: $2,630,349
 Number of Payouts: 72

Borgata Poker Open

 Casino: Borgata Hotel Casino & Spa, Atlantic City, New Jersey
 Buy-in: $3,500
 6-Day Event: September 20–25, 2015
 Number of Entries: 1,027
 Total Prize Pool: $3,287,427
 Number of Payouts: 100

WPT Maryland Live

 Casino: Maryland Live! Casino, Hanover, Maryland
 Buy-in: $3,500
 5-Day Event: September 25–29, 2015
 Number of Entries: 337
 Total Prize Pool: $1,063,000
 Number of Payouts: 36

Emperors Palace Poker Classic

 Casino: Emperors Palace Hotel Casino, Johannesburg, South Africa
 Buy-in: $3,600
 4-Day Event: October 29 – November 1, 2015
 Number of Entries: 135
 Total Prize Pool: $312,030
 Number of Payouts: 15

WPT UK

 Casino: Dusk Till Dawn Poker & Casino, Nottingham, England
 Buy-in: £2,200
 6-Day Event: November 3–8, 2015
 Number of Entries: 450
 Total Prize Pool: £1,000,000
 Number of Payouts: 54

bestbet Poker Scramble

 Casino: bestbet Jacksonville, Jacksonville, Florida
 Buy-in: $5,000
 5-Day Event: November 6–10, 2015
 Number of Entries: 412
 Total Prize Pool: $1,915,800
 Number of Payouts: 53

WPT Montreal

 Casino: Playground Poker Club, Kahnawake, Quebec
 Buy-in: $3,850
 7-Day Event: November 13–19, 2015
 Number of Entries: 697
 Total Prize Pool: $2,366,315
 Number of Payouts: 81

WPT Prague

 Casino: King's Casino Prague, Prague, Czech Republic
 Buy-in: €3,300
 6-Day Event: December 1–6, 2015
 Number of Entries: 256
 Total Prize Pool: €730,340
 Number of Payouts: 27

Five Diamond World Poker Classic

 Casino: Bellagio Resort & Casino, Las Vegas, Nevada
 Buy-in: $10,400
 6-Day Event: December 14–19, 2015
 Number of Entries: 639
 Total Prize Pool: $6,198,300
 Number of Payouts: 63

Borgata Winter Poker Open

 Casino: Borgata Hotel & Casino, Atlantic City, New Jersey
 Buy-in: $3,500
 6-Day Event: January 31-February 5, 2016
 Number of Entries: 1,171
 Total Prize Pool: $3,748,371
 Number of Payouts: 110

Fallsview Poker Classic

 Casino: Fallsview Casino, Niagara Falls, Ontario
 Buy-in: $5,000
 4-Day Event: February 21–24, 2016
 Number of Entries: 423
 Total Prize Pool: $1,907,544
 Number of Payouts: 54

L.A. Poker Classic

 Casino: Commerce Casino, Commerce, California
 Buy-in: $10,000
 6-Day Event: February 27-March 3, 2016
 Number of Entries: 515
 Total Prize Pool: $4,944,000
 Number of Payouts: 63

Bay 101 Shooting Star

 Casino: Bay 101, San Jose, California
 Buy-in: $7,500
 5-Day Event: March 7–11, 2016
 Number of Entries: 753
 Total Prize Pool: $5,138,800
 Number of Payouts: 72

WPT Rolling Thunder

 Casino: Thunder Valley Casino Resort, Lincoln, California
 Buy-in: $3,500
 5-Day Event: March 12–16, 2016
 Number of Entries: 409
 Total Prize Pool: $1,308,800
 Number of Payouts: 46

WPT Vienna

 Casino: Montesino Vienna, Vienna, Austria
 Buy-in: €3,300
 6-Day Event: March 15–20, 2016
 Number of Entries: 234
 Total Prize Pool: €680,940
 Number of Payouts: 27

Seminole Hard Rock Poker Showdown

 Casino: Seminole Hard Rock Hotel & Casino, Hollywood, Florida
 Buy-in: $3,500
 7-Day Event: April 14–20, 2016
 Number of Entries: 1,222
 Total Prize Pool: $3,910,400
 Number of Payouts: 153

Seminole Hard Rock Poker Finale

 Casino: Seminole Hard Rock Hotel & Casino, Hollywood, Florida
 Buy-in: $10,000
 5-Day Event: April 17–21, 2016
 Number of Entries: 342
 Total Prize Pool: $3,249,000
 Number of Payouts: 43

WPT Tournament of Champions

 Casino: Seminole Hard Rock Hotel & Casino, Hollywood, Florida
 Buy-in: $15,400 (Only past WPT champions could enter, with Season XIV winners receiving free entry)
 3-Day Event: April 22–24, 2016
 Number of Entries: 64
 Total Prize Pool: $1,060,000
 Number of Payouts: 8

References

World Poker Tour
2015 in poker
2016 in poker